The Diocese of Tampico is a Latin Church ecclesiastical territory or diocese of the Catholic Church in Mexico It is a suffragan in the ecclesiastical province of the metropolitan Archdiocese of Monterrey. It was erected 12 March 1870 as the Diocese of Ciudad Victoria-Tamaulipas and renamed 25 February 1958.

Bishops

Ordinaries
Francisco de la Concepción Ramírez y González, O.F.M. (1861–1869) 
Jose Maria Ignacio Montes de Oca y Obregón (1871–1879), appointed Bishop of Linares o Nueva León, Nuevo León 
Giuseppe Ignazio Eduardo Sánchez Camacho (1880–1896) 
Filemón Fierro y Terán (1897–1905) 
José de Jesús Guzmán y Sánchez (1909–1914) 
José Guadalupe Ortíz y López (1919–1923), appointed Bishop of Chilapa, Guerrero
Serafín María Armora y González (1923–1955) 
Ernesto Corripio y Ahumada (1956–1967), appointed Archbishop of Antequera, Oaxaca; future Cardinal
Arturo Antonio Szymanski Ramírez (1968–1987), appointed Bishop of San Luis Potosí
Rafael Gallardo García, O.S.A. (1987–2003) 
José Luis Dibildox Martínez (2003–2018)
José Armando Álvarez Cano (2019–present)

Auxiliary bishop
Ernesto Corripio y Ahumada (1952-1956), appointed Bishop here; future Cardinal

Other priest of this diocese who became bishop
Roberto Yenny García, appointed Bishop of Ciudad Valles, San Luís Potosí In 2020

Territorial losses

Episcopal See
Tampico, Tamaulipas

See also
 Immaculate Conception Cathedral, Tampico

External links and references

Tampico
Tamaulipas
Tampico, Roman Catholic Diocese of
Tampico
Tampico
1861 establishments in Mexico